Pancalieri is a comune (municipality) in the Metropolitan City of Turin in the Italian region Piedmont, about 30 km southwest of Turin.

Pancalieri borders the following municipalities: Osasio, Virle Piemonte, Vigone, Lombriasco, Casalgrasso, Villafranca Piemonte, Faule,  and Polonghera.

Twin towns — sister cities
Pancalieri is twinned with:

  Ataliva, Argentina, since 2003

References

Cities and towns in Piedmont